is a railway station on the Kashii Line operated by JR Kyushu in Higashi-ku, Fukuoka, Fukuoka Prefecture, Japan.

Lines

Station layout 
The station, which is unstaffed, consists of a side platform serving a single track at grade. The station building is the right wing of the entrance block of the Umi-no-Nakamichi Seaside Park and houses a waiting room and automatic ticket vending machines.

Adjacent stations

History
On 15 July 1941, the stop was upgraded to a full station. On 19 September 1942, the Hakata Bay Railway and Steamship, with a few other companies, merged into the Kyushu Electric Tramway. Three days later, the new conglomerate, which had assumed control of the station, became the Nishi-Nippon Railroad (Nishitetsu). On 1 May 1944, Nishitetsu's track from Saitozaki to Umi was nationalized. Japanese Government Railways (JGR) took over control of the station and designated the track which served as the Kashii Line. On 9 March 1987, Japanese National Railways, the postwar successor of JGR, moved the station further north along the track nearer to the starting point at Saitozaki. The location of the old station became the Nakamichi signal box. With the privatization of JNR on 1 April 1987, JR Kyushu took over control of the station.

On 14 March 2015, the station, along with others on the line, became a remotely managed "Smart Support Station". Under this scheme, passengers using the automatic ticket vending machines or ticket gates could receive assistance via intercom from staff at a central support centre.

Passenger statistics
In fiscal 2016, the station was used by an average of 502 passengers daily (boarding passengers only), and it ranked 245th among the busiest stations of JR Kyushu.

References

External links
Umi-no-Nakamichi (JR Kyushu)

Railway stations in Fukuoka Prefecture
Railway stations in Japan opened in 1935